Lars Erik Hindmar (born Karlsson; 11 December 1921 – 21 December 2018) was a Swedish racewalker. He competed at the 1952 Summer Olympics in the 10 km and at the 1956 Summer Olympics in the 20 km event, but was disqualified in both cases.

References

1921 births
2018 deaths
Swedish male racewalkers
Olympic athletes of Sweden
Athletes (track and field) at the 1952 Summer Olympics
Athletes (track and field) at the 1956 Summer Olympics
People from Borås
Sportspeople from Västra Götaland County
20th-century Swedish people
21st-century Swedish people